Peter Doyle (born 1951) is an Australian author, musician, and visual artist. He lives in Newtown, New South Wales, and works for Macquarie University where he teaches Print Media Production and as a part-time curator of Sydney’s Justice and Police Museum.

Biography
Peter Doyle was born in Maroubra, Sydney, New South Wales, and grew up in Sydney's eastern suburbs, which provides much of the setting for his fiction work.
He has a Bachelor of Arts (Communications) from UTS and a PhD in Media and Mass Communications on the renderings of virtual space in early popular music recording from Macquarie University (2002). He also maintains a research interest in comics and the graphic novel, the history of twentieth century popular music, as well as crime writing, both in Australia, and overseas.

He worked variously as a taxi driver, musician, and teacher prior to his first publication, Get Rich Quick in 1996, which won him Australia's prestigious Ned Kelly Award for Best First Crime Novel in 1997. He followed this with another successful sequel, Amaze Your Friends, which won him another award, the Ned Kelly Award  for Best Crime Novel in 1998. His third title, The Devil's Jump, released in 2001, was a prequel, and was set in Sydney in the closing days of World War II.

His curatorial work at the Sydney Justice and Police Museum has seen him curate two major exhibitions, ‘Crimes of Passion’ (2002–2003), and ‘City of Shadows: inner city crime and mayhem, 1912-1948’ (November 2005-February 2007), both of which were social histories of inner-city twentieth century Sydney from the point of view of crime scene photography.

His musical style is a mixture of Sydney blues, rockabilly, country and pub rock scenes, and his interest in music is a strong influence in his fiction writing.

Awards
Co-winner of 1997 Ned Kelly Award  for Best First Crime Novel for Get Rich Quick
Winner 1999 Ned Kelly Award  Best Crime Novel for Amaze Your Friends
Association of Recorded Sound Collections (ARSC) 2006 award for Best Research in Record Labels and General History
2006 National Trust/Energy Australia Heritage Award in the Interpretation and Presentation, Corporate and Government division

Works

Novels

Non-fiction

Other articles
 Writing Sound: Popular music in Australian Fiction, Altitude, Issue 8, 2007
 Signs and Wonders: Little Richard in Australia, 1957, Meanjin, Vol.65, No.3, 2006
 Public eye, private eye: Sydney police mug shots, 1912-1930, Scan, vol 2, number 3, December 2005
 Lost City Found: interview with Luc Sante, Scan, vol 2, number 3, December 2005
 From "My blue heaven" to "Race with the Devil": echo, reverb and (dis)ordered space in early popular music recording Popular Music, May 2004 23/1 pp. 31–49
 Three way stretch, UTS Review, November, 2000 6/2 pp. 126–140
 Flying saucer rock'n'roll: the Australian press confronts early rock'n'roll music Perfect Beat, July, 1999, 4/3, pp. 24–47
 The socio-semiotics of electricity substations in Social Semiotics, No.1, 1991.

Doyle has written feature articles, reviews and short pieces for The Bulletin, HQ and The Sydney Morning Herald. He has also been a columnist for Max and Sydney City Hub.

References

External links

1951 births
Australian crime writers
Australian educators
Australian taxi drivers
Writers from Sydney
Living people
Ned Kelly Award winners